The South Africa national cricket team toured Australia in the 1931-32 season and played five Test matches against Australia.  Australia won the series 5–0, all of their victories being by a substantial margin, three of them by an innings.

Test series summary

First Test
{{Two-innings cricket match
| date = 27, 28, 30 November, 1, 2, 3 December 1931(Timeless Test)
| team1 = 
| team2 = 

| score-team1-inns1 = 450 (137.3 overs)
| runs-team1-inns1 = DG Bradman 226
| wickets-team1-inns1 = AJ Bell 4/120 (42 overs)

| score-team2-inns1 = 170 (138.1 overs)
| runs-team2-inns1 = B Mitchell 58
| wickets-team2-inns1 = H Ironmonger 5/42 (47 overs)

| score-team1-inns2 = 
| runs-team1-inns2 = 
| wickets-team1-inns2 =

| score-team2-inns2 = 117 (f/o) (60.1 overs)
| runs-team2-inns2 = HW Taylor 47
| wickets-team2-inns2 = TW Wall 5/14 (15.1 overs)

| result = Australia won by an innings and 163 runs
| report = Scorecard
| venue = Brisbane Cricket Ground, Woolloongabba, Brisbane
| umpires = GE Borwick and GA Hele
| toss = Australia won the toss and elected to bat.
| rain = 29 November was taken as a rest day.There was no play on the third and fourth days.| notes = HC Nitschke (AUS) made his Test debut.
}}

Second Test

Third Test

Fourth Test

Fifth Test

References

Annual reviews
 Wisden Cricketers' Almanack 1933

Further reading
 Bill Frindall, The Wisden Book of Test Cricket 1877-1978, Wisden, 1979
 Chris Harte, A History of Australian Cricket, Andre Deutsch, 1993
 Ray Robinson, On Top Down Under'', Cassell, 1975

External links
 CricketArchive – tour summaries

1931 in Australian cricket
1931 in South African cricket
1932 in Australian cricket
1932 in South African cricket
Australian cricket seasons from 1918–19 to 1944–45
International cricket competitions from 1918–19 to 1945
1931-32